O Incio is a municipality in the  province of Lugo in Galicia in north-west Spain.

The main attraction is the small church of Hospital, surrounded by oak and chestnut forest in a western orientated narrow valley. It is a very well preserved Romanesque church from the 12th century, in of grey marble. Part of the decoration is taken from the ruins of the nearby Roman town of Lucus Augusti (modern day Lugo).

References

Municipalities in the Province of Lugo